The Byrd Theatre is a cinema in the Carytown neighborhood of Richmond, Virginia. It was named after William Byrd II, the founder of the city. The theater opened on December 24, 1928 to much excitement and is affectionately referred to as "Richmond’s Movie Palace".  It was the first cinema in Virginia to be outfitted when built with a sound system (although other existing theaters had already been retrofitted for sound).

History
Built in 1928, the theater cost $900,000 (inflation adjusted equivalent $12,430,000 in 2014) to construct. The builders were Charles Somma and Walter Coulter. The original name for the theater was the State Theater, but by the completion of the construction the name was already taken. It was then named after William Byrd II, founder of the city of Richmond.

The Byrd Theatre opened for the first time on December 24, 1928. At the time, adult tickets were 50 cents for evening shows and 25 cents for matinees, while a child's tickets was only 10 cents.  The first movie was the film "Waterfront", a First National film starring Dorothy Mackaill and Jack Mulhall. In addition, the manager at the time was Robert Coulter, who remained the manager until his retirement in 1971, and is rumored to haunt the theatre.

In 1953, the original 35mm Simplex standards were replaced by Simplex XL 35mm projectors and the theater now mainly uses a Barco digital projector (although both 35mm Projectors are maintained and still used from time to time) as seen on a Historic Richmond 2015 tour of the projection room.

The original Brenkert Master Brenograph (F7 Model) is still used to project the Byrd Theater logo on the curtain (along with other effects).

Architecture
The theatre's architect and contractor was Fred Bishop, and is considered to be of a French Empire style design. Inside, the theatre contains orchestra seating (main) for 916 and balcony seating for 476. The balcony is open whenever attendance requires and occasionally at other times by making a donation to the Byrd Theatre Foundation. The interior features a lavish design by the Arthur Brunet Studios of New York. In addition to eleven Czechoslovakian crystal chandeliers, including an 18-foot, two-and-a-half ton chandelier suspended over the auditorium (with over 5,000 crystals illuminated by 500 red, blue, green and amber lights), the interior features imported Italian and Turkish marble, hand-sewn velvet drapes, and oil on canvas murals of Greek mythology. More unusual features included a central vacuum system and a natural spring which used to supply water to the air conditioning system.

Built during the transition between silent and talking pictures, the designers outfitted the theatre with two sound systems. One of these was Vitaphone, a relatively new sound synchronization system using phonograph records that was commercially developed by Warner Brothers. "The Jazz Singer," generally acknowledged as the first talking film, was recorded using this system. The other original sound system was from Western Electric. Because at the time there was uncertainty whether "talkies" would continue to be popular and a significant number of the films distributed were still silent, the Byrd also included a Wurlitzer Theatre organ.

The Wurlitzer Organ
The Wurlitzer organ of the Byrd Theatre is housed in four rooms on the fourth floor above the stage. The basement also houses a vacuum blower for the piano and an elevator room which raises the organ console to stage level for performances. There is an electrical and pneumatic switching system that aids the organist in choosing which pipes and other devices to use (all of the pipe work, bells, drums, and other effects are acoustic and not electronic). As the sound level of the pipes themselves cannot be changed, the sound levels in the actual auditorium are controlled by large slats called swell shades that open and close to control the volume and a tone chute that carries the sound from the fourth floor.

There is a Lyon and Healy harp which is purely ornamental and does not play, along with a marimba that does play from the organ console in the right box.  In the left box there is a Wurlitzer grand piano which can be played from the organ console or its own keyboard and a 37-note xylophone that plays from the console.

House organists have been Carl Rhond, Wilma Beck, Waldo S. Newberry, Slim Mathis, Bill Dalton, Harold Warner, Eddie Weaver, Art Brown, James Hughes, Lin Lunde, and Bob Lent. In the 1950s, Dick Leibert made recordings playing the organ. The Wurlitzer is still played Saturday nights by current house organist Bob Gulledge.

Preservation
As a result of its longevity, the Byrd Theatre was designated as a Virginia Historic Landmark in 1978, followed in 1979 by listing on the National Register of Historic Places. In 2007, the Byrd Theatre Foundation, a non-profit 501(c)(3) corporation, entered into a purchase agreement for the Byrd with the express purpose of restoring and preserving this theatre as a community resource.

Today the theatre still shows movies 365 days a year, and has not been re-modeled (with the exception of repairs and minor changes such as the installment of a larger screen, new digital projection equipment and a concession stand). In 2017 the center section of seats on the main floor were removed and replaced with 236 new seats and an ADA platform. The new rows of seats are further apart than the originals offering much needed leg room. The remaining seat frames are still original, and though some are torn, most of the upstairs patterned mohair-covered upholstery is still original. In 2004, Ray Dolby, who created the Dolby Digital sound system, toured the Byrd and was so impressed with the theatre that he donated a Dolby Digital sound system, which was installed in 2006.

The Byrd now plays second-run movies for $4.00 per ticket with the exception of certain festivals such as the Richmond French Film Festival, held annually in March. In 2007, the Byrd discontinued regular playing of classic movies at midnight shows on Saturday nights due to dwindling attendance. When the Theatre isn't being used for second-run movies, the Foundation hopes to integrate cultural, educational and community aspects into the Theatre's programming while still offering movies at reasonable prices.

In 2010, a thief stole the "Byrd Cage" donation box, probably netting less than $100 but causing about $1,200 worth of damage to the front doors. Media coverage following the event, however, inspired Richmonders to donate much needed money for the landmark.

From 2007 to 2014, the Byrd Theatre Foundation raised more than $1 million for replacing the roof, renovating the heating and cooling units, and investing in digital projection.  Currently, the orchestra section's seating is being replaced with new seats which include more legroom and cupholders.  Management expects the seating in the orchestra section to be fully installed by September 2017.  The original seats are available through an online request form.

References

External links
Byrd Theatre official website
 archive of earlier official website
Some photographs inside The Byrd posted on Flickr.
 Richmond, Virginia, a National Park Service Discover Our Shared Heritage Travel Itinerary

National Register of Historic Places in Richmond, Virginia
Theatres completed in 1928
Cinemas and movie theaters in Virginia
Movie palaces
Theatres in Richmond, Virginia
1928 establishments in Virginia
Theatres on the National Register of Historic Places in Virginia
Public venues with a theatre organ